Paedembiidae is a family of webspinners in the order Embioptera. There are at least three genera and three described species in Paedembiidae.

Genera
These three genera belong to the family Paedembiidae:
 Badkhyzembia Gorochov & Anisyutkin, 2006
 Paedembia Ross, 2006
 Uranembia Blyummer, 2017

References

Further reading

 
 
 
 

Embioptera